Global City Innovative College is a private college in Makati, Metro Manila, Philippines. It began in 2002 when a group of entrepreneurs joined to establish the first collegiate education center in what was then the Fort Bonifacio Special Economic Zone. It is non-denominational, co-educational, and primarily serves the students in its area. Known as "the Yellow Building," the school was located along 31st Street at the corner of 2nd Avenue near Metro Manila's main thoroughfare, EDSA.

Course offerings include BS Business Administration, BS Hospitality Management , BS Accountancy, BS Tourism, BS Information Technology, BS Medical Technology and other Technical/ Vocational short courses. It is accredited by the Commission on Higher Education and the Technical Education and Skills Development Authority. GCIC now offers the Senior High School (SHS) program as approved by  the Department of Education (DepEd).

Administration
The school has a central administration led by Engr. Michael S. Tan and his team who oversees academic affairs, institutional development, community relations, international linkages and other operational concerns.

GCIC was established and opened in 2002 back when the Fort Bonifacio Area, now known as Bonifacio Global City ( BGC)  was at its infancy at the Bonifacio Technology Center.

References

External links
Global City Innovative College official website

Universities and colleges in Makati
Educational institutions established in 2002
Business schools in the Philippines
Hospitality schools in the Philippines
Cooking schools in the Philippines
Nursing schools in the Philippines
2002 establishments in the Philippines